The Chère is a  long river in the Loire-Atlantique and Ille-et-Vilaine départements, northwestern France. Its source is at Soudan. It flows generally west. It is a left tributary of the Vilaine into which it flows between Pierric and Sainte-Anne-sur-Vilaine.

Communes along its course
This list is ordered from source to mouth: 
Loire-Atlantique: Soudan, Châteaubriant, Rougé, Saint-Aubin-des-Châteaux, Sion-les-Mines, Mouais, Derval, 
Ille-et-Vilaine: Grand-Fougeray, 
Loire-Atlantique: Pierric, 
Ille-et-Vilaine: Sainte-Anne-sur-Vilaine

References

Rivers of France
Rivers of Brittany
Rivers of Loire-Atlantique
Rivers of Ille-et-Vilaine
Rivers of Pays de la Loire